Easter Ellister (Aolastradh) is a settlement on the Rinns of Islay on Islay in the Inner Hebrides of Scotland. It lies just off the A847 road between Portnahaven and Port Charlotte.

References

External links 

Easter Ellister's website 

Villages in Islay